The canton of Saint-Vallier is an administrative division of the Drôme department, southeastern France. Its borders were modified at the French canton reorganisation which came into effect in March 2015. Its seat is in Saint-Vallier.

It consists of the following communes:
 
Albon
Andancette
Anneyron
Beausemblant
Claveyson
Fay-le-Clos
Laveyron
Ponsas
Saint-Barthélemy-de-Vals
Saint-Jean-de-Galaure
Saint-Rambert-d'Albon
Saint-Uze
Saint-Vallier

References

Cantons of Drôme